Narmina Mammadova (born 15 February 1990) is an Azerbaijani former footballer who played as a forward. She has been a member of the Azerbaijan women's national team.

References

1990 births
Living people
Women's association football forwards
Azerbaijani women's footballers
Azerbaijan women's international footballers